Vincent Ebrahim (born 1951) is a South African actor and comedian. He is known for portraying the roles of Ashwin in the BBC later Sky One comedy series The Kumars at No. 42 (2001–2006, 2014), pub landlord Bobby in the BBC One comedy series After You've Gone (2007–2008), Robert "Big Bob" Gupta in the Channel 4 soap opera Hollyoaks (2014) and Hashim Elamin in the ITV soap opera Coronation Street (2021).

Early life 
Ebrahim studied drama at the University of Cape Town. He immigrated to England in 1976, where he began an acting career. He is the brother of actress Vinette Ebrahim.

Career
Ebrahim spent a decade with community theatre companies performing in plays such as Away From It by the Common Stock Theatre Company, Borderline by Hanif Kureishi and the Joint Stock Theatre Company and infamous stage play Tartuffe. Since 1990, he has worked with Tara Arts, performing in such plays as Le Bourgeois Gentilhomme, Tartuffe, Oedipus Rex, Troilus and Cressida, and Antigone. He has also performed in many radio plays for BBC World Service and BBC Radio 4 in the UK. He also appeared on stage at the Tricycle Theatre in the critically praised play The Great Game. Ebrahim is probably best known for playing Ashwin Kumar, the finance-obsessed father on The Kumars at No. 42. In March 2013, he won the Safta for Best Supporting Actor in a Feature Film for his work in Material, which won the best film award.

Filmography

References

External links
 

1951 births
Living people
South African male stage actors
University of Cape Town alumni
South African people of Indian descent
South African male radio actors
South African emigrants to the United Kingdom